The 2010 Adria Superleague Formula round was a Superleague Formula round held on September 5, 2010, at the Adria International Raceway circuit, Adria, Italy. It was Superleague Formula's first visit to the circuit after visits in previous years to Italy's Vallelunga and Monza circuits. It was the eighth round of the 2010 Superleague Formula season.

Only sixteen clubs took part, a record low for the series, including Italian clubs A.C. Milan and A.S. Roma. Sporting CP and GD Bordeaux cited "technical problems" as reasons for not competing.

Support races included PL Auto and Formula 2000 Light.

Report
María de Villota did not compete in qualifying or the races having aggravating an old neck injury during the second free practice session. "It was in my hands", she said, "it was just so painful". María joined the regulars in the commentary box on SF's live feed for the Sunday races. That left only fifteen cars to compete, SF's smallest ever grid.

Qualifying

Race 1

Race 2

Super Final

Results

Qualifying
 In each group, the top four qualify for the quarter-finals.

Group A

Group B

Knockout stages

Grid

Race 1

Race 2

Super Final

Standings after the round

References

External links
 Official results from the Superleague Formula website

Adria
Superleague Formula